Atrial enlargement refers to a condition where the left atrium or right atrium of the heart is larger than would be expected. It can also affect both atria.

Types include:
 Left atrial enlargement
 Right atrial enlargement

References

Cardiomegaly